During the Parade of Nations at the opening ceremony of the 2016 Summer Paralympics, athletes from each participating country paraded in the Maracanã Stadium, preceded by its flag and placard barrier. Each flag bearer had been chosen either by the nation's National Paralympic Committee or by the athletes themselves.

Parade order
All nations paraded in an alphabetical order in Brazilian Portuguese, except the host country, Brazil, who entered last.

Countries and flag bearers 
The following is a list of all parading countries with their respective flag bearer, sorted in the order they appeared in the parade.  This is sortable by country name under which they entered, the flag bearer's name, or the flag bearer's sport. Names are given as were officially designated by the IPC.

See also
 2016 Summer Olympics Parade of Nations

References

Parade of Nations
Lists of Paralympic flag bearers
Parades in Brazil